The year 559 BC was a year of the pre-Julian Roman calendar. In the Roman Empire, it was known as year 195 Ab urbe condita. The denomination 559 BC for this year has been used since the early medieval period, when the Anno Domini calendar era became the prevalent method in Europe for naming years.

Events
 Cyrus the Great succeeds his father Cambyses I of Anshan.
 In the year of his accession (560–559 BC), the Babylonian king Neriglissar commands the declaration of an intercalendary month, so that his first year of kingship begins on Nisan 1 of 559 BC.

Births
 Amitis Shahbanu, Achaemenid queen

Deaths
 Cambyses I, father of Cyrus the Great and king of Anshan

References